Agricultural philosophy (or philosophy of agriculture) is, roughly and approximately, a discipline devoted to the systematic critique of the philosophical frameworks (or ethical world views) that are the foundation for decisions regarding agriculture. Many of these views are also used to guide decisions dealing with land use in general. (Please see the Wikipedia article on environmental philosophy.) In everyday usage, it can also be defined as the love of, search after, and wisdom associated with agriculture, as one of humanity's founding components of civilization. However, this view is more aptly known as agrarianism. In actuality, agrarianism is only one philosophy or normative framework out of many that people use to guide their decisions regarding agriculture on an everyday basis. The most prevalent of these philosophies will be briefly defined below.

Utilitarian approach
This view was first put forth by Jeremy Bentham and John Stuart Mill. Though there are many varieties of utilitarianism, generally the view is that a morally right action is an action that produces the maximum good for people. This theory is a form of consequentialism; which basically means that the correct action is understood entirely in terms of the consequences of that action. Utilitarianism is often used when deciding farming issues. For example, farmland is commonly valued based upon its capacity to the grow crops that people want. This approach to valuing land is called Asset Theory (in contrast to Location Theory) and it is based upon utilitarian principles. Another example is when a community decides on what to do with a particular parcel of land. Let's say that this community must decide to use it for industry, residential uses, or for farming. By using a utilitarian approach, the council would judge which use would benefit the greatest number of people in the community and then make their choice based upon that information. Finally, it also forms the foundation for industrial farming; as an increase in yield, which would increase the number of people able to receive goods from farmed land, is judged from this view to be a good action or approach. Indeed, a common argument in favor of industrial agriculture is this it is a good practice because it increases the benefits for humans; benefits such as food abundance and a drop in food prices.

However, several scholars and writers, such as Peter Singer, Aldo Leopold, Vandana Shiva, Barbara Kingsolver, and Wendell Berry have argued against this view. For example, Singer argues that the suffering of animals (farm animals included) should be included in the cost/benefit calculus when deciding whether or not to do an action such as industrial farming. It has also been challenged on the grounds that farmland and farm animals are instrumentalized in this view and not valued in and of themselves. In addition, systems thinkers, deep ecologists, and agrarian philosophers (such as Aldo Leopold & Wendell Berry) critique this view on the grounds that it ignores aspects of farming which are morally applicable and/or intrinsically valuable. The Slow Food Movement and the Buy Local Agricultural Movements are also built upon philosophical views morally opposed to extreme versions of this approach. Other critiques will be explored below when different philosophical approaches to agriculture are briefly explained. However, it is important to note that the utilitarian approach to agriculture is currently the most widespread approach within the modern Western World.

Libertarian approach

Another philosophical approach often used when deciding land or farming issues is Libertarianism. Libertarianism is, roughly, the moral view that agents own themselves and have certain moral rights including the right to acquire property. In a looser sense, libertarianism is commonly identified with the belief that each person has a right to a maximum amount of liberty when this liberty does not interfere with other people's freedom. A well known libertarian theorist is John Hospers. Within this view, property rights are natural rights. Thus, it would be acceptable for a farmer to inefficiently farm their land as long as they don't harm others while doing it. In 1968, Garrett Harden applied this philosophy to land/farming issues when he argued that the only solution to the "Tragedy of the Commons" was to place soil and water resources into the hands of private citizens. He then supplied utilitarian justifications to support his argument and, indeed, one could argue that libertarianism is rooted in utilitarian ideals. However, this leaves libertarian based land ethics open to the above critiques lodged against utilitarian approaches to agriculture. Even excepting these critiques, the libertarian view has been specifically challenged by the critique that people making self-interested decisions can cause large ecological and social disasters such as the Dust Bowl disaster. Even so, it is a philosophical view commonly held within the United States and, especially, by U.S. ranchers and farmers.

Egalitarian approach
Egalitarian-based views are often developed as a response to libertarianism. This is because, while libertarianism provides for the maximum amount of human freedom, it does not require a person to help others. It also leads to the grossly uneven distribution of wealth. A well known egalitarian philosopher is John Rawls. When focusing on agriculture, what this translates into is the uneven distribution of land and food. While both utilitarian and libertarian approaches to agriculture ethics could conceivably rationalize this mal-distribution, an egalitarian approach typically favors equality whether that be equal entitlement and/or opportunity to employment or access to food. However, if one recognizes that people have a right to something, then someone has to supply this opportunity or item, whether that be an individual person or the government. Thus, the egalitarian view links land and water with the right to food. With the growth of human populations and the decline of soil and water resources, egalitarianism could provide a strong argument for the preservation of soil fertility and water.

Ecological or systems approach
In addition to utilitarian, libertarian, and egalitarian philosophies, there are normative views that are based upon the principle that land has intrinsic value and positions coming out of an ecological or systems view. Two main examples of this are James Lovelock's Gaia hypothesis which postulates that the Earth is an organism and deep ecologists who argue that human communities are built upon a foundation of the surrounding ecosystems or the biotic communities. While these philosophies can be useful for guiding decision making on issues concerning land in general, they have limited usefulness when applied to agriculture because they privilege natural ecosystems and agricultural ecosystems are often considered not natural. One philosophy grounded in the principle that land has intrinsic value which is directly applicable to agriculture is Aldo Leopold's stewardship ethic or land ethic, in which an action is correct if it tends to "preserve the integrity, stability, and beauty of the biotic community". Similar to egalitarian-based land ethics, many of the above philosophies were also developed as alternatives to utilitarian and libertarian based approaches. Leopold's ethic is currently one of the most popular ecological approaches to agriculture commonly known as agrarianism. Other agrarianists include Benjamin Franklin, Thomas Jefferson, J. Hector St. John de Crèvecœur (1735–1813), Ralph Waldo Emerson (1803–1882), Henry David Thoreau (1817–1862), John Steinbeck (1902–1968), Wendell Berry (b. 1934), Gene Logsdon (b. 1932), Paul B. Thompson, and Barbara Kingsolver.

References

Agriculture in society
Agriculture